State Road 223 (NM 223) is a  state highway in the US state of New Mexico. NM 223's western terminus is at NM 63 and the eastern terminus of NM 50 in Pecos, and NM 223's eastern terminus is a continuation as County Route B64 (CR B64) east-northeast of Pecos.

Major intersections

See also

References

223
Transportation in San Miguel County, New Mexico